The Wabash River Conference is an eight-member Indiana High School Athletic Association (IHSAA)-sanctioned conference located within Fountain, Parke, Vermillion, and Warren Counties in West Central Indiana. All of the participating schools are either 1A, 2A, or 3A (South Vermillion) institutions in rural counties. The conference began in 1964 with nine schools who had outgrown their county conferences or had them fold, and has had that number stay relatively consistent since. The only change since was the consolidation of two members, Turkey Run and Rockville, into Parke Heritage High School in 2018 reducing the number of members to 8.

Membership

 Played concurrently in the WRC and HAC 1966-71.
 Played concurrently in the WRC and FCAA 1964-65.
 Played concurrently in the WRC and WCC 1964-73.
 Played in WIC 1999-2015.

Former members

 Played concurrently in the WRC and FCAA 1964-65.

Facilities

 Facilities may be renamed after consolidation.

Football Champions
Split championships are denoted with asterisks.

 No longer plays in WRC.
 *Shared Title

State Championships

Attica (1)
 2001 Boys Basketball (A)

Fountain Central (1)
 1983 Boys Football (A)

North Vermillion (2)
 2002 Girls Basketball (A)
 2014 Boys Football (A)

Riverton Parke (1)
 2010 Girls Softball  (A)

Seeger (1)
 2004 Boys Football (A)

Covington (0)

South Vermillion (0)
 N/A

Parke Heritage (0)
• N/A

Resources 
 IHSAA Conferences
 IHSAA Directory

References

Indiana high school athletic conferences
High school sports conferences and leagues in the United States